William E. Shattuc (18 November 1894, Madisonville, Ohio – 26 October 1962, Lubbock, Texas) was an American racecar driver. Being a practicing pulmonary physician in Louisville, Kentucky earned him the nickname "Doc". He arguably was the first member of his profession to race at Indianapolis.

Dr. Shattuc was the grandson of William Bunn Shattuc, a former Congressman from Ohio.

Indy 500 results

References

Indianapolis 500 drivers
1894 births
1962 deaths
People from Lubbock, Texas
Racing drivers from Ohio
Sportspeople from Cincinnati
Racing drivers from Louisville, Kentucky